Arthur Cunha da Rocha (born 10 January 1990), or better known as Arthur Cunha, is a Brazilian professional footballer who plays as a centre-back.

Early career
Cunha trained at Manchester United in 2007. He underwent tests with the U-17 team, having previously trained in the junior team Fluminense.

Honours

Club
Estoril Praia
 Liga Intercalar: 2009–10
Duque de Caxias
 Copa Rio: 2013
Mitra Kukar
 General Sudirman Cup: 2015
Arema
 Indonesia President's Cup: 2017, 2019
Negeri Sembilan
 Malaysia Premier League: 2021

References

External links 
 

1990 births
Brazilian footballers
Living people
Association football defenders
Boavista Sport Club players
Desportivo Brasil players
G.D. Estoril Praia players
Tupi Football Club players
Duque de Caxias Futebol Clube players
Negeri Sembilan FC players
Arema F.C. players
Mitra Kukar players
Uberaba Sport Club players
Persipura Jayapura players
Footballers from Rio de Janeiro (city)